John William Rolfe Kempe  (29 October 1917 – 10 May 2010) was headmaster of Gordonstoun School from 1968–1978, during the period that the Princes Andrew and Edward arrived at the school. He was a noted mountaineer and a member of the Alpine Club.

Early life
He was born in Nairobi, the son of an officer in the Colonial Service. His father died of fever when he was four and Kempe was brought up in Norfolk by his mother. He was educated at Stowe School and Clare College, Cambridge, where he read economics and mathematics. 

At Cambridge he joined the University Air Squadron and in 1937 was commissioned in the Royal Air Force Volunteer Reserve.  In 1941, he was posted to No. 602 Squadron RAF, which was initially stationed at RAF Drem near Haddington. During the Battle of Britain, the squadron was relocated to Sussex where Kempe flew Spitfires. In May 1942, he was promoted to squadron leader and the following year was mentioned in despatches. From 1944 he flew, principally Mosquitos, in North Africa and acted as a convoy escort on the Malta run. Before being demobilised in 1946, he was again mentioned in despatches.

Teaching career

After three years as a Mathematics teacher at Gordonstoun School he was offered the post of headmaster at a new school in Hyderabad, India, being set up along English public school lines (Hyderabad Public School). He remained there until 1955, when he was appointed headmaster of Corby Grammar School in Northamptonshire, where he remained until 1967. The following year he took up the post of headmaster of Gordonstoun where he remained until his retirement in 1978.

Public roles
Kempe was a member of the Mount Everest Foundation committee (1956–62), chairman of the Round Square International Service Committee (1979–87). He was also vice-chairman of the European Atlantic Movement Committee (1982–1992; vice-president thereafter), and trustee of the University of Cambridge Kurt Hahn Trust from 1986 to 1989.
He was appointed CVO in the 1980 New Year Honours.

Publications
A Family History of the Kempes (1991)

Family
In 1957 he married Barbara Huxtable; they had two sons and a daughter.

References

External links
 Obituary in The Scotsman, 25 May 2010

1917 births
2010 deaths
Commanders of the Royal Victorian Order
Indian schoolteachers
Heads of schools in England
Heads of schools in Scotland
Scottish schoolteachers
British expatriates in Kenya
British expatriates in India
Royal Air Force Volunteer Reserve personnel of World War II
Alumni of Clare College, Cambridge